Michel Ménard (born 20 May 1961) was a member of the National Assembly of France.  He represented 
Loire-Atlantique's 5th constituency from 2007 to 2017, as a member of the Socialiste, radical, citoyen et divers gauche.

References

1961 births
Living people
Deputies of the 13th National Assembly of the French Fifth Republic
Deputies of the 14th National Assembly of the French Fifth Republic